Mount Dallmann is a bold mountain,  high,  east of the northern portion of the Conrad Mountains, in the Orvin Mountains of Queen Maud Land, Antarctica. It was discovered by the Third German Antarctic Expedition (1938–1939), led by Captain Alfred Ritscher, and named for Eduard Dallmann, a German whaling captain who explored along the west coast of the Antarctic Peninsula in 1873–1874. Dallmann was the first person to navigate under the German flag in Antarctic waters.

See also
 List of mountains of Queen Maud Land
 Slabotnen Cirque

References

External links
 Scientific Committee on Antarctic Research (SCAR)
 

Mountains of Queen Maud Land
Orvin Mountains